Tamara Mikhailovna Tansykkuzhina (born December 11, 1978 in Naberezhnye Chelny, Soviet Union) is a Russian international draughts player. She has won the Women's World Championship seven times, two times won Women's Draughts European Championship and is among the 20 best players in Russia regardless of gender. She was an honored guest at a festival held in her native Bashkortostan. In 2013 World Draughts Championship she took 8 place in group B.

She's a 7 time and the current Women's Draughts World Champion.

Active member of Russian political party "United Russia". Actively supports Russia's invasion to Ukraine.

Sport achievements

World Championship
 2001, 2002, 2004, 2007, 2011, 2019, 2021 — 1st place

European Championship
 2000, 2008 — 1st place

Participation in World and European Championships

External links 
 FMDJ player information
 Profile FMJD
 Profile KNDB

References 

Bashkir people
1978 births
Russian draughts players
Players of international draughts
Living people
Bashkir women
Sportspeople from Tatarstan